Hari Ghosher Gowal  is a horror-comedy Bengali film produced by Pijush Saha and directed by Subhabrata Chaterjee, the film features newcomers and Srija in lead roles. It is  released on 29 November 2019. This film, presented by Prince Entertainment P4, revolves around a boys hostel.

Synopsis
The comedy flick revolves around a boys’ hostel Shri Chaitanya Adarsha Chatrabash where Hari Mohan Ghosh aka Hari Ghosh is the man in charge. However, one day Adi, a boarder of this hostel attempts suicide after being ditched by his girlfriend but a mysterious lady saves him and it all starts from here on. A series of comic errors dismantle Hari Ghosh's peaceful life.

Cast

Srija as Ishita
Monojyoti Mukherjee as Hari Ghosh
Parthasarathi Banerjee as Nimai
Suman as Sam
Utpal as Kausik

Soundtrack

References

External links
 

2019 films
Indian comedy films
Bengali-language Indian films
2010s Bengali-language films